R392 road may refer to:
 R392 road (Ireland)
 R392 road (South Africa)